Close and True is a legal drama first broadcast on ITV from 23 November to 28 December 2000, starring Robson Green and James Bolam as the eponymous characters, John Close and Graham True respectively. The series follows Close (Green) as he takes over a run-down legal practice in Newcastle owned by True (Bolam), who now resides in a mental institution. During his first days in charge of the practice, he is thrown into the midst of a murder trial, despite having no previous criminal trial experience.

This programme was produced by Costal Productions in association with Meridian Broadcasting for the ITV network, with just six episodes of the drama were produced, before it was axed by ITV in 2001. The series was released on VHS on 29 January 2001, but has never been issued on DVD in the United Kingdom. The series was released on Region 4 DVD in Australia in 2008.

Cast
 Robson Green as John Close
 Susan Jameson as Sally Ann Mae
 Kerry Ann Christiansen as Kim Cotton
 James Bolam as Graham True
 Jamie Bell as Mark Sheedy
 Nicola Grier as Ibi Bagdioni
 Richard Sands as Gordon Short
 Pamela Ruddock as Mary Close
 Louise Delamere as Jessica Laing
 Kerry Rolfe as Paula Farrent
 Mark Moraghan as Steve Sheedy
 Melanie Hill as Maureen Taylor
 Peter Sullivan as Peter Heart

Episodes

References

External links

ITV television dramas
2000s British legal television series
2000 British television series debuts
2000 British television series endings
2000s British drama television series
2000s British television miniseries
Television series by ITV Studios
Television shows produced by Meridian Broadcasting
English-language television shows
Television shows set in Newcastle upon Tyne
Television shows set in Tyne and Wear